Louis Philippe may refer to:

People

French House of Orléans
Louis Philippe I, Duke of Orléans 'le Gros' (1725–1785)
 Louis Philippe II, Duke of Orléans (1747–1793), his son
 Louis-Philippe I, King of the French (1773–1850), his son, last King of France
 Louis Philippe, Crown Prince of Belgium (1833–1834), his grandson
 Prince Philippe, Count of Paris (1838–1894), his grandson, called King Louis Philippe II by some factions
 Luís Filipe, Prince Royal of Portugal (1887–1908), his grandson

Others
Louis Philippe, comte de Ségur (1753–1830), French diplomat and historian
Louis-Philippe Pelletier (1857–1921), Canadian politician
Louis-Philippe Brodeur (1862–1924), Canadian politician
Louis-Philippe Pigeon (1905–1986), Canadian jurist
Louis-Philippe de Grandpré (1917–2008), Canadian jurist
Louis Philippe (musician) (born 1959), French indie pop musician

Other
Louis Philippe (brand), an Indian brand of men's apparel

See also
Louis Phillips (disambiguation)